This is a list of Greek football transfers in the summer transfer window 2014 by club.

Asteras Tripolis 

In:

Out:

Atromitos 

In:

Out:

Ergotelis 

In:

Out:

Kalloni 

In:

Out:

Levadiakos 

In:

Out:

OFI Crete

In:

Out:

Olympiacos 
In:

( fee €1M)
(fee €300.00)
(fee 400.000 € )
( fee €0)
(fee €2M)
(fee €5M) 
(fee €600,000)
 (fee €2M)
(fee €0)
(fee €400.00)
( fee €0)
(free transfer)
(fee €3,5M)

(fee €600.00)
( fee €0)

Out:

 (fee:€2,500,000)
(fee:€500,000)
(free transfer)
 (free transfer)
 (free transfer)
 (free transfer)
 (free transfer)
 (free transfer)
 (free transfer)
 (free transfer)
(fee:€10,000,000)
(fee:€13M +2M bonus)
(fee:€1M +0,5M bonus)
 (free transfer)
 (free transfer)
 (free transfer)

Panathinaikos

In:

Out:

Panetolikos 

In:

Out:

Panionios 

In:

Out:

Panthrakikos 

In:

Out:

PAOK

In:

 

Out:

PAS Giannina 

In:

Out:

Platanias 

In:

Xanthi 

In:

Veria 

In:

Out:

See also
  I-League transfers for the 2014–15 season
  List of Bulgarian football transfers summer 2014
  List of Cypriot football transfers summer 2014
  List of Dutch football transfers summer 2014
  List of English football transfers summer 2014
  List of Maltese football transfers summer 2014
  List of German football transfers summer 2014
  List of Portuguese football transfers summer 2014
  List of Spanish football transfers summer 2014
  List of Latvian football transfers summer 2014
  List of Serbian football transfers summer 2014

References

2014
Greece
Transfers